The Liberty Bank  (libert'i banki), formerly the People's Bank of Georgia (sak'art'velos sakhalkho banki) is a private bank in Georgia, the third largest in the country by total assets with 5.6% market share as of June 2017. It has the largest network of branches in Georgia.

History
Liberty Bank is the successor to the state-owned “AgroMretsvBank” which was privatised in 1994 and renamed to “People’s Bank of Georgia” in 2002.

The People's Bank of Georgia had the largest customer service network in Georgia. Under the leadership of George Goguadze, the Bank opened 210 branches across the country. As Goguadze's strategy was to establish extensive coverage around the country, the Bank was able to win a state tender for the rights of issuance of pensions and other social benefits. At the end of 2008 which was the last year of Goguadze's executive operation at the JSC People's Bank, the Bank had 1.5 million clients which represent about 30% of entire Georgia's population. 

In September 2009 91.2% of its shares were acquired by Liberty Investments Holding B.V., a newly established joint venture of Georgia's former Prime Minister, Lado Gurgenidze and Romanian tycoon Dinu Patriciu, while the bank was renamed Liberty Bank.

The ultimate beneficial owners of the Bank are Irakli Rukhadze (US citizen), Ben Marson (UK citizen) and Igor Alexeev (US citizen).

External links
Liberty Bank
Online Services Of LB Liberty Bank
List of Georgian Banks

References

Banks of Georgia (country)
Companies based in Tbilisi
Banks established in 1993
1993 establishments in Georgia (country)
Companies listed on the Georgian Stock Exchange